The 2014 IAAF World Race Walking Cup was held in Taicang, China, on 3–4 May 2014.  The course was a 2 km loop along Shanghai Road between Banjing Road and Loujiang Road in the centre of the city. It has already been used for the annual IAAF World Race Walking Challenge event.    Detailed reports on the event and an appraisal of the results was given for the IAAF.

Complete results were published for individuals and teams.

Medallists

Results

Men's 20 km

IAAF Rule 230.6(a): repeated failure to comply with the definition of race walking

Team (Men 20 km)

Men's 50 km

IAAF Rule 230.6(a): repeated failure to comply with the definition of race walking

Team (Men 50 km)

Men's 10 km (Junior)

IAAF Rule 230.6(a): repeated failure to comply with the definition of race walking

Team (Men 10 km Junior)

Women's 20 km

*: beyond Time Limit
IAAF Rule 230.6(a): repeated failure to comply with the definition of race walking

Team (Women 20 km)

Women's 10 km (Junior)

IAAF Rule 230.6(a): repeated failure to comply with the definition of race walking

Team (Women 10 km Junior)

Medal table (unofficial)

Note: Totals include both individual and team medals, with medals in the team competition counting as one medal.

Participation
According to an unofficial count, 350 athletes from 48 countries participated.

 (13)
 (8)
 (5)
 (8)
 (2)
 (8)
 (1)
 (21)
 (10)
 (2)
 (4)
 (9)
 (3)
 (1)
 (11)
 (7)
 (1)
 (4)
 (10)
 (1)
 (5)
 (18)
 (10)
 (6)
 (2)
 (8)
 (3)
 (14)
 (3)
 (3)
 (4)
 (11)
 (13)
 (1)
 (21)
 (1)
 (8)
 (6)
 (5)
 (21)
 (6)
 (4)
 (1)
 (4)
 (5)
 (21)
 (4)
 (13)

References

External links
IAAF WORLD RACE WALKING CUP - TAICANG 2014 - FACTS & FIGURES

World Athletics Race Walking Team Championships
World Race Walking Cup
International athletics competitions hosted by China
World Race Walking Cup
Sport in Jiangsu